Bennie Ross "Hank" Crawford, Jr. (December 21, 1934 – January 29, 2009) was an American alto saxophonist, arranger and songwriter whose genres ranged from R&B, hard bop, jazz-funk, and soul jazz. Crawford was musical director for Ray Charles before embarking on a solo career releasing many well-regarded albums for labels such as Atlantic, CTI and Milestone.

Biography
Crawford was born in Memphis, Tennessee, United States.  He began formal piano studies at the age of nine and was soon playing for his church choir. His father had brought an alto saxophone home from the service and when Hank entered Manassas High School, he took it up in order to join the band. He credits Charlie Parker, Louis Jordan, Earl Bostic and Johnny Hodges as early influences.

Crawford appears on an early 1952 Memphis recording for B.B. King, with a band including Ben Branch and Ike Turner.

In 1958, Crawford went to college at Tennessee State University in Nashville, Tennessee. While at TSU, he majored in music studying theory and composition, as well as playing alto and baritone saxophone in the Tennessee State Jazz Collegians. He also led his own rock 'n' roll quartet, "Little Hank and the Rhythm Kings". His bandmates all thought he looked and sounded just like Hank O'Day, a local saxophonist, which earned him the nickname "Hank". This is when Crawford met Ray Charles, who hired Crawford originally as a baritone saxophonist. Crawford switched to alto in 1959, and remained with Charles' band — becoming its musical director until 1963.

When Crawford left Ray Charles in 1963 to form his own septet, he had already established himself with several albums for Atlantic Records. From 1960 until 1970, he recorded twelve LPs for the label, many while balancing his earlier duties as Ray's director. He released such pre-crossover hits as "Misty", "The Peeper", "Whispering Grass", and "Shake-A-Plenty".

He also has done musical arrangement for Etta James, Lou Rawls, and others. Much of his career has been in R&B, but in the 1970s he had several successful jazz albums, with I Hear a Symphony reaching 11 on Billboards Jazz albums list and 159 for Pop albums.

David Sanborn cites Crawford as being one of his primary influences. Crawford is recognized by saxophonists as having a particularly unique and pleasing sound. In 1981, he featured, with fellow horn players Ronnie Cuber and David Newman, on B.B. King's There Must Be a Better World Somewhere.

In 1983 he moved to Milestone Records as a premier arranger, soloist, and composer, writing for small bands including guitarist Melvin Sparks, organist Jimmy McGriff, and Dr. John. In 1986, Crawford began working with blues-jazz organ master Jimmy McGriff. They recorded five co-leader dates for Milestone Records: Soul Survivors, Steppin' Up, On the Blue Side, Road Tested, and Crunch Time, as well as two dates for Telarc Records: Right Turn on Blue and Blues Groove. The two toured together extensively.

The new century found Crawford shifting gears and going for a more mainstream jazz set in his 2000 release The World of Hank Crawford. Though the songs are compositions from jazz masters such as Duke Ellington and Tadd Dameron, he delivers in that sanctified church sound that is his trademark. Followed by The Best of Hank Crawford and Jimmy McGriff (2001).

Crawford died on January 29, 2009, at his home in Memphis, aged 74. The cause was complications of a stroke he had in 2000, his sister Delores said.

Discography
As leader/co-leader

As sidemanWith Ray CharlesRay Charles at Newport (Atlantic, 1958)
What'd I Say (Atlantic, 1959)
Ray Charles in Person (Atlantic, 1959)
Modern Sounds in Country and Western Music (ABC-Paramount, 1962)With Eric ClaptonJourneyman (Warner Bros., 1989)With Grant GreenEasy (Versatile, 1978)With Johnny HammondBreakout (Kudu/CTI Records, 1971)With Etta JamesThe Right Time (Elektra, 1992)With B.B. KingThere Must Be a Better World Somewhere (MCA, 1981)
Let the Good Times Roll (MCA, 1999)With David "Fathead" NewmanFathead Comes On (Atlantic, 1962)
Still Hard Times (Muse, 1982)
Fire! Live at the Village Vanguard (Atlantic, 1989)With Shirley ScottShirley Scott & the Soul Saxes (Atlantic, 1969)With Janis Siegel'''The Tender Trap'' (Monarch, 1999)

References

External links
Hank Crawford bio
All About Jazz: Hank Crawford

1934 births
2009 deaths
American jazz alto saxophonists
American male saxophonists
Crossover jazz saxophonists
Hard bop saxophonists
Jazz-funk saxophonists
Musicians from Memphis, Tennessee
Ray Charles
Rhythm and blues saxophonists
Soul-jazz saxophonists
Tennessee State University alumni
Atlantic Records artists
Milestone Records artists
Columbia Records artists
20th-century saxophonists
American male jazz musicians
CTI Records artists
20th-century American male musicians